Ji Jung-hee (born 18 March 1985) is a South Korean female professional volleyball player. 
She was part of the South Korea women's national volleyball team.

She participated at the 2005 FIVB World Grand Prix,  2006 FIVB World Grand Prix, and 2007 FIVB World Grand Prix.

She played with Daejeon KGC.

References

External links 

 FIVB profile
 South Korea's Ji Jung-Hee and Choi Kwang-Hee tries to block Brazil's...

1981 births
Living people
South Korean women's volleyball players